Fejér (in Latin: comitatus Albensis) was an administrative county (comitatus) of the Kingdom of Hungary. Its territory, which was slightly smaller than that of present Fejér county, today in central Hungary. The capital of the county was Székesfehérvár.

Geography
Fejér county shared borders with the Hungarian counties Veszprém, Komárom, Pest-Pilis-Solt-Kiskun and Tolna. It lay southwest of Budapest, around Székesfehérvár. The river Danube formed most of its eastern border. Its area was 4129 km2 around 1910.

History
Fejér county arose as one of the first comitatus of the Kingdom of Hungary, in the 11th century. Székesfehérvár, as a seat for the coronation of the Hungarian monarch and location of royal burials, held a central role in the Middle Ages.
The Solt region, east of the Danube river, which used to be part of Fejér county, went to Pest-Pilis-Solt county in 1569.

In 1945, the city of Érd and its surroundings went to Pest county, while in 1950 the region south-east of Lake Balaton (around Enying), which used to be in Veszprém county went to Fejér county.

Demographics

1891
Ethnic groups (1891):
 Hungarians (Magyars): 190,660 (85.7%)
 Germans: 26,077 (11.7%)
 Slovaks: 2924 (1.3%)
 Serbs: 2103 (0.9%)
Total population: 222,445

1900
In 1900, the county had a population of 236,102 people and was composed of the following linguistic communities:

Total:

 Hungarian: 202,890 (85.9%)
 German: 25,713 (10.9%)
 Slovak: 4,180 (1.8%)
 Serbian: 965 (0.4%)
 Croatian: 441 (0.2%)
 Romanian: 116 (0.0%)
 Ruthenian: 10 (0.0%)
 Other or unknown: 1,787 (0.8%)

According to the census of 1900, the county was composed of the following religious communities:

Total:

 Roman Catholic: 161,474 (68.4%)
 Calvinist: 58,616 (24.8%)
 Jewish: 7,863 (3.3%)
 Lutheran: 6,741 (2.9%)
 Greek Orthodox: 1,017 (0.4%)
 Unitarian: 254 (0.1%)
 Greek Catholic: 117 (0.0%)
 Other or unknown: 20 (0.0%)

1910

In 1910, the county had a population of 250,670 people and was composed of the following linguistic communities:

Total:

 Hungarian: 218,822 (87.3%)
 German: 24,265 (9.7%)
 Slovak: 4,359 (1.7%)
 Serbian: 814 (0.3%)
 Croatian: 333 (0.1%)
 Romanian: 37 (0.0%)
 Ruthenian: 5 (0.0%)
 Other or unknown: 2,035 (0.8%)

According to the census of 1910, the county was composed of the following religious communities:

Total:

 Roman Catholic: 175,464 (70.0%)
 Calvinist: 59,105 (23.6%)
 Jewish: 7,382 (3.0%)
 Lutheran: 7,267 (2.9%)
 Greek Orthodox: 1,060 (0.4%)
 Unitarian: 202 (0.0%)
 Greek Catholic: 161 (0.0%)
 Other or unknown: 29 (0.0%)

Subdivisions

In the early 20th century, the subdivisions of Fejér county were:

References

1692 establishments in Europe
1543 disestablishments
States and territories disestablished in 1946
Counties in the Kingdom of Hungary